The discrete-stable distributions are a class of probability distributions with the property that the sum of several random variables from such a distribution is distributed according to the same family. They are the discrete analogue of the continuous-stable distributions.

The discrete-stable distributions have been used in numerous fields, in particular in scale-free networks such as the internet, social networks or even semantic networks.

Both the discrete and continuous classes of stable distribution have properties such as infinitely divisibility, power law tails and unimodality.

The most well-known discrete stable distribution is the Poisson distribution which is a special case as the only discrete-stable distribution for which the mean and all higher-order moments are finite.

Definition 
The discrete-stable distributions are defined through their probability-generating function

In the above,  is a scale parameter and  describes the power-law behaviour such that when ,

When  the distribution becomes the familiar Poisson distribution with mean .

The original distribution is recovered through repeated differentiation of the generating function:

A closed-form expression using elementary functions for the probability distribution of the discrete-stable distributions is not known except for in the Poisson case, in which 

As compound probability distributions 
The entire class of discrete-stable distributions can be formed as Poisson compound probability distributions where the mean, of a Poisson distribution is defined as a random variable with a probability density function (PDF). When the PDF of the mean is a one-sided continuous-stable distribution with stability parameter  and scale parameter  the resultant distribution is discrete-stable with index  and scale parameter .

Formally, this is written:

where  is the pdf of a one-sided continuous-stable distribution with symmetry paramètre  and location parameter .

In other words,

In the Poisson limit 

The convergence of i.i.d. random variates with power-law tails  to a discrete-stable distribution is extraordinarily slow when  - the limit being the Poisson distribution when  and  when .

See also 
 Stable distribution
 Poisson distribution

References

Further reading 
 Feller, W. (1971) An Introduction to Probability Theory and Its Applications, Volume 2. Wiley. 
 
 

Discrete distributions
Types of probability distributions